Claire Robertson D'Amore (born June 4, 1982, in Torrance, California) is a female beach volleyball player from the United States who has won numerous tournaments and awards, including: six CBVA wins in a row, the gold medal in Guatemala  NORCECA, the gold medal at the NORCECA Circuit 2009 at Jamaica playing with Emily Day. As an AVP player, she was rookie of the year 2006, Top upcoming Player 2007, and rated top 5 in digs from 2007 to 2010.

She studied at Northern Arizona University, where she got a degree in Health Promotion and Physical Education receiving as a student athlete the awards of 2001 NAU Golden Eagle Scholar Athlete Award, All Tournament at the 2003 Fiesta Bowl Tournament, 2003 "All Conference Second Team" and 2002 "All Conference Honorable Mention".

In 1998, she won the Girls U16/U15 National Beach Championship, playing with Tawny Schulte.

Awards

College
 2003 Fiesta Bowl Tournament, All Tournament
 2003 All Conference Second Team
 2002 All Conference Honorable Mention
 2001 NAU Golden Eagle Scholar Athlete Award

AAU
 2005 Girls U16/U15 National Beach Championship  Gold Medal

National Team
 NORCECA Beach Volleyball Circuit Jamaica 2009  Gold Medal

References

External links
 FIVB Profile
 BV Database Profile
 AVP Profile
 Claire Web Site

1982 births
Living people
American women's beach volleyball players
Northern Arizona University alumni
People from Rolling Hills Estates, California
21st-century American women